Cathedral of St. John the Baptist  Also Saint-Jean-Baptiste Cathedral  is a cathedral located in the town of McLennan in northwestern Alberta.

The cathedral is the seat of the Roman Catholic archdiocese of Grouard–McLennan which was created in 1862 as an apostolic vicariate and was elevated to an archdiocese in 1967 by the bull "Adsiduo perducti" of Pope Paul VI.

The current building traces its history to 1928, being built as a cathedral between 1946 and 1947, the year in which it obtained its current status. The current Archbishop is Gérard Pettipas.

References

See also 
 List of cathedrals in Canada

Roman Catholic churches in Alberta
Roman Catholic cathedrals in Alberta